According to the Historia Augusta, Firmus (died 273) was a usurper during the reign of Aurelian. The contradictory accounts of his life and the man himself are considered to be a complete fabrication, perhaps based on the later Firmus.

Historia Augusta account 
According to the Historia Augusta ("Firmus"), Firmus was a man of great wealth. He had  his house fitted with square panels of glass, and owned a huge library. His commercial relationships involved Blemmyes, Saracens, and India. He had two elephant tusks, which later Aurelian projected to use as a basis for a statue to Jupiter and which were actually given as a present by Carinus. Physically, Firmus was noteworthy, being huge and very strong. Firmus was notably also a heavy drinker and could eat quite a bit. The Historia Augusta states that he once consumed an entire ostrich in one day, and even beat one of Aurelian's standard bearers and notorious drinkers in a drinking contest, draining two buckets of wine while remaining completely sober. The importance and threat of Firmus' revolt is related to the interruption of the Egyptian grain supply to Rome.

Notes

References

Primary sources 
 "Firmus Saturninus Proclus et Bonosus" 3-6, Historia Augusta
 "Aurelianus" xxxii.2‑3, Historia Augusta
Zosimus i.61.1

Secondary sources 
 "Firmus", s.v. "Aurelian", De Imperatoribus Romanis site

273 deaths
3rd-century Roman usurpers
People whose existence is disputed
Year of birth unknown